Prannok Pier, also known as the Siriraj Pier or Wang Lang Pier with designated pier number N10, is a pier on the Chao Phraya River located at the Siriraj Subdistrict, Bangkok Noi District in the area adjacent Siriraj Hospital and Wang Lang Market.

Description

Prannok Pier is in the middle between Tha Chang (N9) and Thonburi Railway Station Piers (N11). It is divided into two piers are Prannok, which is the pier for Chao Phraya Express Boat, that runs between Bangkok and the north ends in Nonthaburi Province, and Tha Wang Lang or Wang Lang Pier is a ferry pier that leads to important places on the Phra Nakhon side such as Tha Prachan, Thammasat University, Sanam Luang, Grand Palace and Wat Phra Kaew, Wat Pho etc.
 
On the morning rush hour of June 14, 1995, there was an extremely depressing accident here. When the pontoon can not support the weight of many passengers, eventually causing a fall. There are 29 deaths and many of them are little students in the uniform.

References

Chao Phraya Express Boat piers
Bangkok Noi district
Buildings and structures in Bangkok
Piers in Thailand